Coleman Dupont Donaldson (September 22, 1922 – August 7, 2009) was a fluid physicist and aeronautical engineer who specialized in turbulent flow and computational fluid dynamics. He made broad contributions during his career in turbulent transport, supersonic flow, and armor.

In 1942 he received a bachelor's degree from Rensselaer Polytechnic Institute. Afterwards he worked for the National Advisory Committee for Aeronautics (NACA) at the Langley Memorial Aeronautical Laboratory. While serving in the Army Air Corps in 1945–1946 he was assigned to Bell Aircraft, where he worked on the development of the X-1 and X-2. Aftwards he worked at NACA again and completed his doctorate at Princeton under Luigi Crocco in 1957. He was elected to the National Academy of Engineering in 1979. He was a member of the Du Pont family and a grandson of T. Coleman du Pont.

References

External links
 Coleman Dupont Donaldson at National Academies Press

Coleman Dupont Donaldson
American aerospace engineers
1922 births
2009 deaths
20th-century American physicists
Princeton University School of Engineering and Applied Science alumni
Rensselaer Polytechnic Institute alumni
Scientists from Philadelphia
Members of the United States National Academy of Engineering
Engineers from Pennsylvania
20th-century American engineers
United States Army Air Forces personnel of World War II